Justine Henin-Hardenne and Meghann Shaughnessy were the defending champions, but Henin-Hardenne did not compete this year as she chose to start her season in Sydney. Shaughnessy teamed up with Ai Sugiyama and reached the quarterfinals where they were forced to withdraw.

Svetlana Kuznetsova and Martina Navratilova won the title by defeating Nathalie Dechy and Émilie Loit 6–4, 6–4 in the final. It was the 4th title for Kuznetsova and the 167th title for Navratilova in their respective doubles careers.

Seeds

Draw

Draw

References

 Main and Qualifying Rounds

Uncle Tobys Hardcourts - Doubles
2003 Uncle Tobys Hardcourts